is a Prefectural Natural Park in Wakayama Prefecture, Japan. Established in 2009, the park spans the borders of the municipalities of Aridagawa, Hidakagawa, and Tanabe.

See also
 National Parks of Japan
 List of Places of Scenic Beauty of Japan (Wakayama)

References

External links
  Map of Jōgamori Hokodai Prefectural Natural Park

Parks and gardens in Wakayama Prefecture
Aridagawa, Wakayama
Hidakagawa, Wakayama
Tanabe, Wakayama
Protected areas established in 2009
2009 establishments in Japan